The Bokaro Steel City - Bhubaneswar Garib Rath Express is a Garib Rath train belonging to the East Coast Railway zone that runs between Bokaro Steel City and Bhubaneswar in India. It is currently being operated with 12831/12832 train numbers on a tri-weekly basis.

Service

The 12831/Bokaro - Bhubaneswar Garib Rath Express has an average speed of 51 km/hr and covers 726 km in 14h 20m. The 12832/Bhubaneswar - Bokaro Garib Rath Express has an average speed of 55 km/hr and covers 726 km in 12h 55m.

Route and halts 

The important halts of the train are:

Coach composite

The train has standard ICF rakes with max speed of 110 km/h. The train consists of 12 coaches.

Traction

One train comprising 12 wagons is hauled by a Visakhapatnam electric loco shed based WAP-7 electric locomotive end to end.

Notes

References

See also

 Dhanbad Junction railway station
 Ranchi Railway Station
 Bhubaneswar railway station

External links 

 12831/Bokaro - Bhubaneswar Garib Rath Express
 12832/Bhubaneswar - Bokaro Garib Rath Express

Transport in Bhubaneswar
Garib Rath Express trains
Rail transport in Odisha
Rail transport in Jharkhand
Railway services introduced in 2008